Paphinia hirtzii is a species of orchid endemic to Ecuador.

Taxonomy 
The classification of this orchid species was published by Calaway H. Dodson in Icones Plantarum Tropicarum ser. 2, 6: t. 566. 1989 - Sarasota, Florida. Collected by C.H.Dodson & A.C.Hirtz 8 km from Chaco on the road to Santa Rosa de Chaco, off the road Ibarra to Lita, 1400 m, Esmeraldas (Ecuador, Western South America, Southern America). The holotype is kept at Herbario Nacional del Ecuador (QCNE). The isotype is kept at Rio Palenque Science Center (RPSC), Ecuador.

Plant morphology 
Description: Epiphyte. Rhizome short. Pseudobulbs appressed, laterally compressed, narrowly ovate, costate, to 2 cm wide and 8 cm long, 2 to 30 foliate, with 2 to 3 distichous, foliaceous sheaths surrounding the base. Leaves thin, heavily veined on the underside, narrowly ovate, acuminate, to 8 cm wide and 32 cm long. The inflorescence is produced from the base of the pseudobulb, pendant, surrounded by 2 to 4 sheaths, 1 to 3-flowered.

Flower morphology

References

External links 

hirtzii
Endemic orchids of Ecuador
Epiphytic orchids